Garrett Popcorn Shops is an American chain of gourmet popcorn stores founded in 1949 in Chicago, Illinois. Today, it has shops in nine countries, corporate offices in Chicago, Singapore, and Tokyo, and an online store. The majority of its brick and mortar stores are still in Chicago, including shops on the Magnificent Mile and in the O'Hare International Airport. As such, it is often referenced as part of classic Chicago cuisine.

Garrett Popcorn Shops is a part of Garrett Brands, which also owns the Frango brand of chocolates.

History
The first store was opened on 10 Madison Street in Chicago, Illinois.

The recipes for several of its popcorn flavors are trade secrets that are based on family recipes.

A tin of Garrett Popcorn was named as one of Oprah's Favorite Things in 2002.

Garrett Brands, the owner of Garrett Popcorn Shops acquired the rights to Frango from Macy's, Inc in 2017.

Flavors

See also
 Culture of Chicago

References

External links
 
 Official website

1949 establishments in Illinois
American companies established in 1949
Companies based in Chicago
Popcorn